Helena Hansen is an American psychiatrist and anthropologist who is a professor and Chair of Translational Social Science at University of California, Los Angeles. Her research considers health equity, and has called for clinical practitioners to address social determinants of health. She holds an Honorary Doctorate from the Icahn School of Medicine at Mount Sinai and was elected Fellow of the National Academy of Medicine in 2021.

Early life and education 
Hansen completed her undergraduate degree at Harvard University. She was a graduate student at Yale University, where she earned both a medical degree and a doctorate in cultural anthropology. During her doctorate research she worked in Havana on AIDS policy. She also spent time in Puerto Rico, where she studied faith healing programmes led by ex-addicts in Christian ministries. She was a clinical resident in psychiatry at NYU Medical Center, where she investigated the introduction of new pharmaceuticals.

Research and career 
Hansen has studied healthcare equality and the social determinants of health. She has investigated the impact of discrimination and healthcare on mental health. Hansen became concerned that neurochemical treatments may be establishing and strengthening racial hierarchies. Hansen created a documentary film based on her doctoral work and supported by the Robert Wood Johnson Foundation. The film, which considered race, class and addiction to pharmaceuticals, debuted at the American Psychiatric Association annual meeting. The film follows three New Yorkers as they move on and off methadone and suboxone.

While at NYU, Hansen taught undergraduate and graduate courses in anthropology. She was made a scholar of the Robert Wood Johnson Foundation in 2009. In 2021, she was elected member of the National Academy of Medicine.

Selected publications

Books

References 

Living people
Members of the National Academy of Medicine
Yale School of Medicine alumni
American women psychiatrists
Year of birth missing (living people)
21st-century American women
Harvard College alumni
University of California, Los Angeles faculty